Breeze Publications is a privately owned publisher based in Lincoln, Rhode Island, serving northern and western Providence County with five free tabloid-format weekly newspapers.

Founded in 1996 by Thomas V. Ward & James Quinn, Breeze Publications began—at first, produced in Ward's living room—with its flagship title, The Valley Breeze, which later grew to two editions. In 2006, the company acquired two other weeklies in neighboring towns. In 2009, they also started a new paper which covers Pawtucket. The papers now employ 19 full-time and eight part-time employees.

Properties 
Each of the Breeze newspapers is printed on tabloid-sized pages and distributed free in the towns it covers, every Thursday, except for The North Providence Breeze and The Valley Breeze Pawtucket edition which are published on Wednesdays.

The North Providence Breeze Originally called the North Star when it was founded in 1997, Breeze acquired the free weekly covering North Providence in 2006 and rebranded it. It does not have a Website of its own, but North Providence news is posted on The Valley Breeze & Observer site.

The Valley Breeze, Cumberland-Lincoln Edition Ward's & Quinn's first Breeze newspaper, The Valley Breeze has covered Cumberland, Rhode Island and Lincoln, Rhode Island, since 1996. It has a distribution of 17,500 copies per week.

The Valley Breeze, North Smithfield-Blackstone-Woonsocket Edition The success of The Valley Breeze led to the establishment of a second edition in 1999, covering North Smithfield and Woonsocket, Rhode Island. In 2001, the newspaper began covering Blackstone, Massachusetts.

The Valley Breeze & Observer Called The Observer when Breeze bought it in 2006, The Valley Breeze & Observer was converted from paid to free delivery. It covers Foster, Glocester, Scituate and Smithfield, Rhode Island, in western Providence County. The Observer was founded in 1955.

The Valley Breeze, Pawtucket Edition Ward's & Quinn's fifth Breeze newspaper, The Valley Breeze has covered Pawtucket, Rhode Island, since 2009. It runs 8,000 copies per week.

Sisters and competitors 
Breeze papers compete with The Providence Journal, the only statewide daily newspaper, and with the RISN Operations dailies The Call and The Times, in Woonsocket and nearby Pawtucket, respectively. In Blackstone, The Valley Breeze competes with the Telegram & Gazette of Worcester, Massachusetts, and with The Milford Daily News of Milford, Massachusetts.

All four Breeze newspapers are members of Rhode Island Newspaper Group, an advertising sales consortium that consists of five weekly newspaper publishers in suburban Providence. Other member publishers are Beacon Communications, East Bay Newspapers, Hathaway Publishing and Southern Rhode Island Newspapers.

References

External links 
www.valleybreeze.com

Newspapers published in Rhode Island
Newspaper companies of the United States
Companies based in Providence County, Rhode Island
Cumberland, Rhode Island
Publishing companies established in 1996